Ulyanovsk, known until 1924 as Simbirsk, is a city and the administrative center of Ulyanovsk Oblast, Russia, located on the Volga River  east of Moscow. Population: 

The city was the birthplace of Vladimir Lenin (born Ulyanov), for whom it was renamed after his death in 1924; and of Alexander Kerensky, the leader of the Russian Provisional Government which Lenin overthrew during the October Revolution of 1917. It is also famous for its writers such as Ivan Goncharov, Nikolay Yazykov and Nikolay Karamzin, and for painters such as Arkady Plastov and Nikas Safronov. UNESCO has designated Ulyanovsk as a City of Literature since 2015.

History
Simbirsk was founded in 1648 by the boyar Bogdan Khitrovo.  The fort of "Simbirsk" (alternatively "Sinbirsk") was strategically placed on a hill on the Western bank of the Volga River. The fort was meant to protect the eastern frontier of the Tsardom of Russia from the nomadic tribes and to establish a permanent royal presence in the area.

In 1668, Simbirsk withstood a month-long siege by a 20,000-strong army led by rebel Cossack commander Stenka Razin. Also in Simbirsk another country rebel, Yemelyan Pugachev, was imprisoned before execution. At the time Simbirsk possessed a wooden kremlin, which was destroyed by a fire during the 18th century.

As the eastern border of the Russian Empire was rapidly pushed into Siberia, Simbirsk rapidly lost its strategic importance, but nonetheless began to develop into an important regional center. Simbirsk was granted city status in 1796.

Simbirsk was then considered an exclusive town favoured by the aristocracy, and besides its churches and a Governor's Place, included an Assembly Of The Nobles, with a magnificent library. The Holy Trinity Cathedral was constructed in a restrained Neoclassical style between 1827 and 1841. In the summer of 1864, in what was believed an arson attack, Simbirsk was mostly destroyed by fire. However, it was quickly rebuilt and continued to grow. Its population, which was 26,000 in 1856, had reached 43,000 by 1897.

In 1924, the city was renamed Ulyanovsk in honor of Vladimir Ulyanov, better known as Lenin, who was born in Simbirsk in 1870. Two other Russian political leaders, Alexander Kerensky and Alexander Protopopov, were also born in Simbirsk.

During the Soviet period, Ulyanovsk was an important tourist center, drawing visitors from around the country because of its revolutionary importance.

After the dissolution of the Soviet Union, the tourist importance of Ulyanovsk sharply decreased. In the 1990s, the city went through the hardest times—a slump in production in all branches, mass unemployment, and a population impoverishment. In the first decade of the 2000s the economy started to grow.

Ulyanovsk slowly recovered from these downturns into regional manufacturing, educational and transportation clusters.

Politics

The city is headed by a mayor who is the executive branch, and city council which is the legislative branch. The term of the mayor is five years. In 2010 the city council abolished the direct elections to the mayor, replacing it with city manager, appointed by the council. Then again, in April 2013 the city charter was amended to re-introduce the direct mayoral election.

Administrative and municipal status
Ulyanovsk serves as the administrative center of the oblast. Within the framework of administrative divisions, it is, together with thirty rural localities, incorporated as the city of oblast significance of Ulyanovsk—an administrative unit with the status equal to that of the districts. As a municipal division, the city of oblast significance of Ulyanovsk is incorporated as Ulyanovsk Urban Okrug.

Demographics

In 2008, there were registered 6,774 births and 8,054 deaths in Ulyanovsk.

Ethnic composition
Russians: 78%
Tatars: 10%
Chuvash: 6%
Mordvins: 2%
Germans: 1%

Climate
Ulyanovsk has a humid continental climate (Köppen climate classification Dfb). Falls are generally warm, with snow beginning to accumulate by mid-November. Winters tend to be cold but with moderate amounts of snowfall and nighttime lows occasionally dipping below . Summer weather arrives in mid-May. The city is subject to frequent, but moderate, droughts. Springs and summers are sunny, but fall and winter are usually cloudy.

Economy

Ulyanovsk is a major, diversified, industrial hub for aircraft and auto industries.

The UAZ automobile manufacturing plant (subsidiary of Sollers JSC);  Aviastar-SP Aircraft Company (part of United Aircraft Corporation);  Scientific and Production Association "Mars" (manufactures industrial control systems for the Russian Navy, a subsidiary of state-owned conglomerate Agat); Ulyanovsk Cartridge Works (manufactures ammunition for firearms); Ulyanovsk Motor Plant (UMZ) and Ulyanovsk Mechanical Plant (UMZ, a subsidiary of JSC Almaz-Antey) are based in the city along with a variety of light industry and food-processing enterprises.

An international airline for unique and heavy cargo, Volga-Dnepr Airlines, is based in the city.

There are many manufacturing facilities of foreign corporations such as Legrand (company), Mars, Incorporated, Takata-Petri, Anadolu Efes S.K., ALFA (Mexico) and others.

Banking is mostly represented by national banks such as Sberbank, VTB Bank, Alfa-Bank, Bin Bank, Ak Bars Bank, MDM Bank, Trust Bank and also regional banks from Ulyanovsk Oblast.

Ulyanovsk has also a strong military base presence in town. The 31st Airborne Brigade of the Russian Airborne Troops of the armed forces is based in Ulyanovsk.

"Bridgestone Tire Manufacturing CIS" - Japan tyre works, work from 2016.

Production of industrial gases: Linde Gas Rus, Spektrum of Gases.

Tourism and hospitality industry

Tourism is a growing industry in the city and the surrounding areas because of Volga micro-climate and historical significance of Simbirsk. Hilton Hotel Group and Marriott Hotels & Resorts are building their hotels in the downtown area.

The region of Undory, a driving distance from Ulyanovsk is famous for its spas and mineral water. The city offers many options for sports enthusiasts. The countryside is ideal for outdoor and water sports. The springs of Undory have been known for more than 200 years. The water at spa is rich in sodium chloride, and comes from artesian wells.

Retail and restaurants

Retail is a growing business segment in this city. International retailers such as Auchan SA, METRO AG, Media Markt, Decathlon as well as local  Russian chains such as X5 Retail, Magnit, Lenta (retail), Sportmaster, M.video opened up their stores in Ulyanovsk.

Aqua Mall is an American-type mall concept that opened in Ulyanovsk on the banks of Sviyaga river with modern cinema theater, IMAX. The city has a large presence of international fast food brands such as McDonald's, Burger King, Baskin Robbins, Sbarro, and others. Local Russian brands are well-represented in this market.

Transportation and logistics

A railway bridge across the Volga was built in 1912–1916 and two automobile lanes were added to it in 1953–1958, allowing for the city to expand on the Eastern (left) bank of the river and transforming it into a local transport hub.

According to Ulyanovsk Region Development Corporation, Ulyanovsk Region is conveniently situated in the center of the European part of Russia, where east west and north south air, rail, car and river routes cross. It has an industrial, transport and business infrastructure and a developed network of roads and railways which provide a good basis for turning Ulyanovsk into a major transport and logistics hub in the Volga Federal district working not only for Ulyanovsk Region's plants but the whole Volga federal district. Ulyanovsk transport hub provides all forms of transport (busy river port and passenger terminal, railways with two major passenger and cargo stations, airports and now two major bridges) apart from sea, which can serve Russian and international cargo traffic to Kazakhstan, Central Asia and South East Asia, Europe, China and back.

As the aging Ulyanovsk bridge, the only crossing of the Volga in the 400 km stretch from Kazan to Tolyatti, could no longer cope with the growing needs of the city, the construction of President Bridge, a truss bridge, began in the late 1980s. Completion was delayed significantly due to catastrophic economic circumstances following the end of the Soviet Union. Its official opening ceremony was on November 24, 2009, by the Russian President Dmitry Medvedev – although traffic was using the bridge a few days earlier. The bridge has a total length of 5.5 km, making it one of the longest in Europe.

The city is divided by the river Sviyaga, a tributary of the Volga whose confluence with it is about 200 km north of the city.

Public transportation in the city is well developed and provided by 17 tram lines, 7 trolleybus routes (and all tram lines are only on the right-bank part of the city, and all the trolley only on the left bank), 50 municipal bus routes, and about 150 fixed-route taxi (marshrutkas) lines. The City of Ulyanovsk has a working plan to build high-speed rail system to connect the two banks of the town.

Ulyanovsk is served by the Ulyanovsk Vostochny Airport (the international airport) in the left-bank part of the city and Ulyanovsk Baratayevka Airport (Ulyanovsk Central Airport) in the right-bank part of the city.

Education

Ulyanovsk State University, established in 1988 as a branch of Moscow State University. At the present time, UlSU is one of the largest higher educational institutions in the Volga region, comprising 6 institutes, 6 independent faculties, 2 affiliates, 5 junior colleges, 6 learning centers. UlSU enrolls about 15 thousand students annually, among them 125 foreign citizens from 20 countries of the world.
Ulyanovsk State Technical University, established in 1957 as Ulyanovsk Polytech University. Today Ulyanovsk State Technical University features over 14,000 students on different education programs at 10 faculties and 48 departments.
Ulyanovsk State Pedagogical University, established in 1932.
Ulyanovsk State Agricultural Academy, established in 1943.
Ulyanovsk Higher Civil Aviation School, founded in 1935 as a training center, designed for training and retraining of flight crews of civil aircraft. In 1992, raised its status to the present. Has branches in Krasny Kut, Saratov Oblast and Sasovo, Ryazan Oblast. When it has Main industry museum of civil aviation history (Ulyanovsk aircraft museum), established in 1983.

There is also a large number of technical and medical community colleges in Ulyanovsk.

Architecture
During the Soviet period, Ulyanovsk lost much of its historical heritage due to both neglect and intentional destruction. All traces of the original wooden fort have disappeared, as have the churches of old Simbirsk; the majority of 19th-century buildings remain in the city, including the houses where Lenin lived between 1870 and 1887. The restoration of the Cathedral of the Holy Trinity was considered, but has since been canceled. However, many historical constructions remain. Among them the house in which writer Ivan Goncharov was born, the Protestant church and other buildings.

Ulyanovsk is home to several tourist destinations around the downtown museum district and famous Volga River tours. The Ulyanovsk State historical memorial complex "Lenin`s hometown" houses the regional city center, the center of Simbirsk-Ulyanovsk. The memorial estate has been recreating the  local culture connected with architecture, education and way of life of Russia since the end of the 19th century until the beginning of the 20th century. The State historical memorial complex "Lenin`s hometown" was founded in 1984. Now it consists of 14 museums and the Showroom, and has got a young creative collective of 152 people.

Sports
Volga plays in the Russian Bandy Super League. Volga-2 plays in the 2nd division. An indoor arena for bandy, Volga-Sport-Arena, opened in 2014, as one of the first in Russia. It has a capacity of 5 000. The Bandy World Championship 2016 was played in Ulyanovsk and nearby Dimitrovgrad. The Youth-17 Bandy World Championship will be hosted by Ulyanovsk in 2018.

In association football, FC Volga plays in "Urals-Volga" zone of the Russian Second Division (2016–2017 season).

Ulyanovsk also hosted matches of  first qualifying round UEFA Women's Under-17 Championship 2014. Matches were held at Trud Stadium in the downtown Ulyanovsk.

In 2017 "Trud" was closed for reconstruction.

In 2017 the first CIS festival for national sports and games, Фестиваль национальных видов спорта и игр государств — участников Содружества Независимых Государств, was held in Ulyanovsk. The main sports were sambo, tug of war, mas-wrestling, gorodki, belt wrestling, lapta, bandy (rink), kettlebell lifting, chess and archery. A few demonstration sports were also a part of the programme.

Notable people

 Vladimir Lenin (1870–1924), communist revolutionary and first premier of the Soviet Union
 Ilya Ulyanov (1831–1886), public figure on public education and teacher
 Ivan Goncharov (1812–1891), novelist and author of Oblomov
 Alexander Pushkin (1799–1837), author, playwright, and poet of the Romantic era
 Nikolay Karamzin (1766–1826), writer, poet, historian, and critic
 Nikolay Yazykov (1803–1846), poet
 Andrey Sakharov (1921–1989), nuclear physicist, dissident, and human rights activist
 Alexander Kerensky (1881–1970), 2nd Prime Minister of the Russian Provisional Government
 Pyotr Chardynin (1873–1934), movie director
 Yusuf Akçura (1876–1935), historian, writer, politician, member of Turkish nationalist movement
 Ludmila Belousova (1935–2017), figure skater and two times Winter Olympics champion
 Raphael Zon (1874–1956), U.S. Forest Service researcher
 Paweł Jasienica (1909–1970), historian, journalist. and soldier for the Polish Army in World War II
 Nikas Safronov (*1956) artist
 Ivan Ozhogin (*1978), musical and opera singer
 Stanislav Zhuk (1935–1998), figure skater and coach

Twin towns – sister cities

Ulyanovsk is twinned with:

Changsha, China
Feodosia, Crimea
Gomel, Belarus
Jincheng, China
Krefeld, Germany
Macon, United States
Minsk, Belarus
formerly Oklahoma City, United States
Shenzhen, China

Wuhu, China
Xiangtan, China

Gallery

Notes

References

Sources

External links
 
Ulyanovsk tourist portal
 
Unofficial website of Ulyanovsk 
History of Simbirsk 
VIDEO No Comment - Ulyanovsk

 
Populated places on the Volga
Populated places established in 1648
1648 establishments in Russia
Simbirsky Uyezd
Vladimir Lenin